Bela Crkva is a town and municipality located in the South Banat District of the autonomous province of Vojvodina, Serbia. The town has a population of 8,868, while the Bela Crkva municipality has 17,285 inhabitants.

Bela Crkva lakes at the outskirts of the town are a popular summer tourist destination.

Name
The name of the town Bela Crkva means "white church" in Serbian. In Romanian, the town is known as Biserica Albă (formerly Albești), in German as Weißkirchen, in Hungarian as Fehértemplom (formerly Fejéregyház), and in Turkish as Aktabya.

History
Neolithic findings of ceramics and burial with Greek-style pots dating to late fifth century BC are founded in the area.

The town was founded in 1717 when this region was included into the Habsburg monarchy. It was part of the Banatian Military Frontier of the Monarchy and, since 1774, was a seat of the Illyrian (Serbian) section of the Banatian Frontier. Briefly, in 1787–1788, the town was controlled by the Ottomans. In 1848–1849, the town was part of autonomous Serbian Vojvodina, but in 1849 it was again placed under military administration. With the abolishment of the Military Frontier, the town was included into Temes county of the Kingdom of Hungary, one of two autonomous parts of Austria-Hungary. The town was also a seat of the district since 1867.

According to the 1910 census, the town itself was mainly populated by Germans with a group of French, but its surrounding municipal area was mainly populated by Serbs. Census recorded 11,524 citizens in the town, of whom 6,062 spoke German language, 1,994 Serbian, 1,806 Romanian, and 1,213 Hungarian. The municipal area numbered 36,831 inhabitants, of whom 20,987 spoke Serbian, 8,234 Romanian, and 4,791 German. The total population of the town and its municipal area counted together was 48,355, of whom 22,981 spoke Serbian, 10,853 German, 10,040 Romanian, and 2,122 Hungarian.

Since 1918, Bela Crkva was part of the Kingdom of Serbs, Croats and Slovenes and subsequent South Slavic states. In the 1920s, it was a center of Russian emigration in Yugoslavia.

Inhabited places
Bela Crkva municipality includes the town of Bela Crkva and the following villages:
 Banatska Palanka
 Banatska Subotica
 Vračev Gaj
 Grebenac
 Dobričevo
 Dupljaja
 Jasenovo
 Kajtasovo
 Kaluđerovo
 Kruščica
 Kusić
 Crvena Crkva
 Češko Selo

Demographics

According to the 2011 census results, the municipality of Bela Crkva has 17,367 inhabitants.

Ethnic groups

Settlements with Serb ethnic majority are: Bela Crkva, Banatska Palanka, Banatska Subotica, Vračev Gaj, Dupljaja, Jasenovo, Kajtasovo, Kaluđerovo, Kruščica, Kusić, and Crvena Crkva. The settlement with Romanian ethnic majority is Grebenac. The settlement with Hungarian ethnic majority is Dobričevo. The settlement with Czech ethnic majority is Češko Selo.

The ethnic composition of the municipality (as of 2011 census):

Gallery

Notable individuals
 Žarko Vasiljević

See also
 List of places in Serbia
 List of cities, towns and villages in Vojvodina
 Bila Tserkva

References

External links
 www.belacrkva.eu
 www.belacrkva.rs
 www.belacrkva.co.rs
 www.bela-crkva.net

 
Populated places in Serbian Banat
Populated places in South Banat District
Municipalities and cities of Vojvodina
Towns in Serbia